KCYC-LP (104.7 FM) is a radio station  broadcasting a country radio format. Licensed to Yuba City, California, United States. The station is currently owned by Sutter County Sheriff's Reserve Association.

Programing

Kickin' Country Top 20 Countdown with Charlee West
Country Drive
Country Fly

References

External links
 

CYC-LP
CYC-LP